Marc Lifschey (June 16, 1926 – November 8, 2000) was an American oboist who played principal oboe for the Cleveland Orchestra, the San Francisco Symphony, the Metropolitan Opera Orchestra, and the Buffalo Philharmonic Orchestra over the course of his life.

Career 
Marc Lifschey was born on June 16, 1926 in New York City. His father, Elias Lifschey, was a violist who was a member of the NBC Symphony Orchestra. Lifschey attended the Curtis Institute of Music, where he studied with Marcel Tabuteau. Lifschey played in the Buffalo Philharmonic for a short period of time before being appointed to principal oboe of the National Symphony Orchestra, a post which he held between 1948 and 1950. After playing with the National Symphony Orchestra, Lifschey became first oboe of the Cleveland Orchestra under George Szell. Lifschey held this post from 1950-1965, with the exception of the 1959-1960 season, during which he played principal oboe for the Metropolitan Opera Orchestra. After leaving Cleveland because of a famous personality clash with Szell,  Lifschey went to the San Francisco Symphony, where he was co-principal under Josef Krips before being appointed principal in his own right. In 1984, William Redington Hewlett endowed the Edo de Waart chair for principal oboe, a seat which Lifschey occupied until his retirement from orchestra playing in 1986.

Lifschey was also an established teacher who was a faculty member at the San Francisco Conservatory of Music and the Jacobs School of Music, part of Indiana University.

Death 
Lifschey died at the age of 74 from a bone marrow disorder.

References 

1926 births
2000 deaths
American classical oboists
Male oboists
Curtis Institute of Music alumni
Musicians from New York City
Deaths from diabetes
Jacobs School of Music faculty
San Francisco Conservatory of Music faculty
20th-century classical musicians
20th-century American musicians
Classical musicians from California
Classical musicians from New York (state)
20th-century American male musicians